This is a list of notable events in country music that took place in 2021.

Events 
 January 4 – Florida Georgia Line duo members Tyler Hubbard and Brian Kelley announce plans to release solo music, but will not be separating.
 January 20 – Following the release of his album Dangerous: The Double Album, Morgan Wallen becomes the first artist to have six songs in the top ten of the Hot Country Songs charts at the same time. He also becomes the first artist to debut at the top of the Hot Country Songs and Top Country Albums charts simultaneously, as well as the first artist to have more than one song debut at the top of the Hot Country Songs chart.
January 27 – At the age of 84, legendary singer-songwriter and actor Kris Kristofferson officially announces his retirement from performing after more than five active decades in the entertainment industry.
February 3 –
Morgan Wallen, whose album Dangerous was number one on the Billboard 200 at the time, has his recording contract with Big Loud Records indefinitely suspended after a video emerges of him using a racial slur. Wallen was also removed from numerous playlists and dropped from more than 400 radio stations. The Academy of Country Music Awards subsequently announced that he would be removed from eligibility for their forthcoming 2021 ceremony.
T.J Osborne, frontman and half of successful duo Brothers Osborne, comes out as gay, making him the first openly gay male artist signed to a major country label.
February 23 – Taylor Swift's "Love Story (Taylor's Version)", a re-recorded version of her 2008 hit "Love Story", debuts at #1 on the Hot Country Songs chart, becoming the first artist to hit #1 twice on that chart with a single song, since Dolly Parton's "I Will Always Love You", in 1974 and 1982.
March 5 – Lonestar lead singer Richie McDonald announces that he will be leaving the band to pursue a career with The Frontmen of Country, a trio also consisting of Tim Rushlow and Larry Stewart, the former lead singers of Little Texas and Restless Heart, respectively, and will be replaced with former Sons of the Desert lead singer Drew Womack. McDonald previously departed Lonestar in 2007 to pursue a solo career, but then returned in 2011.
 March 22 - Morgan Wallen's Dangerous: The Double Album becomes the first album to spend its first ten weeks at number one on the Billboard 200 since 1987.
 April 1 – Confederate Railroad lead singer Danny Shirley breaks his back in an undisclosed accident.
 April 18 - Music writer Holly G. founds the Black Opry, a website and touring revue dedicated to black artists in country music.
 June 11 – High Valley mandolin player Curtis Rempel announces he is leaving the group and moving back to his hometown in Alberta to pursue a business with his wife, leaving older brother and frontman Brad Rempel as the last remaining of three brothers who formed the group.
July 3 - Blake Shelton and Gwen Stefani are married at their Tishomingo ranch in Oklahoma, 6 months after their engagement.
 July 13 – Ashley Monroe announces that she has been diagnosed with a rare form of blood cancer.
July 16 – Tanya Tucker announces she underwent emergency hip replacement surgery and was forced to cancel all tour dates.
September 28 – Alan Jackson announces he has been diagnosed with Charcot–Marie–Tooth disease for a decade, affecting his ability to perform on tour.
October 8 – Rascal Flatts lead singer Gary LeVox announces that the band is disbanding following the cancellation of their farewell tour and band member Joe Don Rooney's departure and DUI arrest one month prior.
October 18 – Luke Bryan is announced as host for the 2021 CMA Awards, marking the first solo host in 18 years, since Vince Gill hosted the 2003 ceremony.

Grand Ole Opry
January 21 – The members of Lady A are invited by Darius Rucker to be inducted into the Grand Ole Opry, effective immediately.
February 6 – A year after her invitation on February 29, 2020, Rhonda Vincent is officially inducted by Dierks Bentley as an Opry member after her initial induction date was delayed by the COVID-19 pandemic.
June 22 – Carly Pearce was invited by Dolly Parton to be a member of the Grand Ole Opry and she was officially inducted on August 3, 2021 by Trisha Yearwood.
August 10 – Southern gospel group The Isaacs are invited by Ricky Skaggs to become Opry members and were inducted by him and The Whites on September 14.
September 28 – Nashville vocalist Mandy Barnett was invited by Connie Smith to be a member of the Opry on her birthday and after making more than 500 appearances over thirty years and was officially inducted by her and her husband Marty Stuart on November 2.
December 4 – The Kentucky Headhunters play the Grand Ole Opry for the first time. The band had previously been rejected from this position in 1990.
December 18 – Lauren Alaina is invited by Trisha Yearwood to become an Opry member. The induction is set for early 2022.

Top hits of the year 

The following songs placed within the Top 20 on the Hot Country Songs, Country Airplay, or Canada Country charts in 2021:

Singles released by American and Australian artists

Singles released by Canadian artists

Top new album releases

Other top albums

Deaths
January 1 – Misty Morgan, 75, American country singer (Jack Blanchard & Misty Morgan), cancer.
January 7 – Jamie O'Hara, 70, American country singer-songwriter ("Grandpa (Tell Me 'Bout the Good Old Days)") and member of The O'Kanes ("Can't Stop My Heart from Loving You"), cancer.
January 8 – Ed Bruce, 81, American actor, country singer-songwriter ("Mammas Don't Let Your Babies Grow Up to Be Cowboys" and "You're the Best Break This Old Heart Ever Had"), natural causes.
 January 12 - Ron Getman, 72, member of The Tractors
January 14 – Larry Willoughby, 73, American country singer-songwriter ("Building Bridges" and "Operator, Operator") and music executive, vice-president of A&R at Capitol Records, COVID-19.
January 16 – Jason "Rowdy" Cope, 42, guitarist for The Steel Woods.
January 18 – Jimmie Rodgers, 87, American pop singer ("Honeycomb" and "Kisses Sweeter Than Wine") who also charted several country singles.
January 21 – Randy Parton, 67, American country singer-songwriter ("Hold Me Like You Never Had Me" and "Shot Full of Love"), younger brother of Dolly Parton, cancer.
February 3 – Jim Weatherly, 77, songwriter ("Midnight Train to Georgia" and "Someone Else's Star"), natural causes
February 9 – Richie Albright, 81, American drummer (Waymore's Outlaws).
February 10 – Lee Sexton, 92, American banjo player.
March 12 – Scott Whitehead, 61, member of Hometown News (natural causes)
April 14 – Rusty Young, 75, singer-songwriter, guitarist, and co-founder of American country rock group Poco.
April 23 – Charlie Black, 71, songwriter ("Come Next Monday", "A Little Good News", and "You Lie")
May 2 – Tommy West, 78, American record producer and singer-songwriter, producer of works by Ed Bruce, Jim Croce, Holly Dunn, Anne Murray, and others.
May 19 – Johnny Ashcroft, 94, Australian country singer.
May 22 – Glenn Douglas Tubb, 85, American singer-songwriter ("Home of the Blues", "Skip a Rope", and "Two Story House").
May 23 – Dewayne Blackwell, 84, American songwriter ("Friends in Low Places" and "I'm Gonna Hire a Wino to Decorate Our Home")
May 29 – B.J. Thomas, 78, American singer who scored country, pop and Christian hits in the 1960s, 1970s and 1980s ("Hooked on a Feeling" and "Raindrops Keep Fallin' on My Head"), lung cancer
July 4 – Sanford Clark, 85, American rockabilly singer (COVID-19).
July 10 – Byron Berline, 77, American fiddler.
August 2 - Clavis Eugene "Gene" Hughey, 80, American bass player (Conway Twitty's Twitty Bird Band) and brother of steel guitar player John Hughey
August 4 – Razzy Bailey, 82, American country singer from 1970s and 1980s who charted five number one singles on the Hot Country Songs chart between 1980 and 1982 ("Friends", "Loving Up a Storm", and "Midnight Hauler").
August 13 – Nanci Griffith, 68, American country folk singer-songwriter ("From a Distance", "Love at the Five and Dime", and "Outbound Plane")
August 20 – Tom T. Hall, 85, American country singer-songwriter ("That's How I Got to Memphis", "Harper Valley PTA", "I Love", "Little Bitty"), suicide.
August 21 – Don Everly, 84, one-half of The Everly Brothers.
August 26 – 
Kenny Malone, 83, American drummer, COVID-19.
Kim Tribble, 69, songwriter ("Guys Do It All the Time", "I Can Still Feel You"), dementia
September 12 – Don Maddox, 98, American country singer (Maddox Brothers and Rose).
September 22 – Bob Moore, 88, American Hall of Fame session bassist (The Nashville A-Team) and orchestra leader.
September 23 – Sue Thompson, 96, American pop and country singer ("Sad Movies (Make Me Cry)", "Norman").
September 26 – George Frayne IV, 77, American country singer and keyboardist (Commander Cody and His Lost Planet Airmen), cancer.
October 14 – Phil Leadbetter, 59, American bluegrass musician, COVID-19.
October 24 – Sonny Osborne, 83 American banjo player and one half of The Osborne Brothers.
October 26 – Rose Lee Maphis, 98, American singer, pioneer of the Bakersfield sound with husband Joe Maphis.
December 2 - Neil Flanz,  83, Canadian pedal steel guitar player, member Steel Guitar Hall of Fame. 
December 4 - Stonewall Jackson, 89, American country singer and Grand Ole Opry member ("Waterloo" and "B.J. the D.J.").
December 10 - Michael Nesmith, 78, American rock (The Monkees) and country rock (First National Band) musician, heart failure.
December 18 - Renée Martel, 74, French Canadian country singer, pneumonia.
December 24 - J. D. Crowe, 84, American banjo player and bluegrass band leader (New South).

Hall of Fame inductees

Country Music Hall of Fame 
(presented on May 1, 2022)
Eddie Bayers
Ray Charles
Pete Drake
The Judds

Canadian Country Music Hall of Fame 
Patricia Conroy
Randy Stark

Bluegrass Hall of Fame 
Alison Krauss
Lynn Morris
The Stoneman Family

Nashville Songwriters Hall of Fame 
Rhett Akins
Buddy Cannon
Amy Grant
Toby Keith
John Scott Sherrill

Major awards

Academy of Country Music Awards 
(presented on March 7, 2022)

Entertainer of the Year – Miranda Lambert
 Male Artist of the Year – Chris Stapleton
 Female Artist of the Year – Carly Pearce
 Group of the Year – Old Dominion
 Duo of the Year – Brothers Osborne
New Male Artist of the Year – Parker McCollum
New Female Artist of the Year – Lainey Wilson
 Songwriter of the Year – Michael Hardy
 Single of the Year – "If I Didn't Love You" (Jason Aldean & Carrie Underwood)
 Song of the Year – "Things a Man Oughta Know" (Jason Nix, Jonathan Singleton, Lainey Wilson
 Album of the Year – Dangerous (Morgan Wallen)
 Musical Event of the Year –  "Never Wanted to Be That Girl" (Carly Pearce & Ashley McBryde)
 Video of the Year – "Drunk (And I Don't Wanna Go Home)" (Elle King & Miranda Lambert)

American Music Awards 
(presented on November 21, 2021)

Favorite Country Album – Goldmine (Gabby Barrett)
Favorite Country Song – "The Good Ones" (Gabby Barrett)
Favorite Male Country Artist – Luke Bryan
Favorite Female Country Artist – Carrie Underwood
Favorite Country Duo/Group –  Dan + Shay

Americana Music Honors & Awards 
(presented on September 22, 2021)

Artist of the Year – Brandi Carlile
Duo/Group of the Year – Black Pumas
Album of the Year – Cuttin' Grass, Vol. 1: The Butcher Shoppe Sessions (Sturgill Simpson)
Song of the Year – "I Remember Everything" – (Pat McLaughlin, John Prine)
Emerging Act of the Year – Charley Crockett
Instrumentalist of the Year – Kristin Weber (guitar)
Trailblazer Award – The Mavericks
Free Speech/Inspiration Award – Carla Thomas
Lifetime Achievement Award for Performance – Keb' Mo'
Lifetime Achievement Award for Producer/Engineer – Trina Shoemaker 
Legacy of Americana Award – Fisk Jubilee Singers

ARIA Awards 
(presented on November 24, 2021)
Best Country Album - The World Today (Troy Cassar-Daley)

Billboard Music Awards
(presented on May 23, 2021)

 Top Country Artist - Morgan Wallen
 Top Male Country Artist - Morgan Wallen
 Top Female Country Artist - Gabby Barrett
 Top Country Duo/Group - Florida Georgia Line
 Top Country Album - Dangerous: The Double Album (Morgan Wallen)
 Top Country Song - "I Hope" (Gabby Barrett)

Canadian Country Music Association Awards 
(presented on November 29, 2021)

Entertainer of the Year - Dallas Smith
Fan Choice - Brett Kissel
Album of the Year - The Lemonade Stand (Tenille Townes)
Alternative Country Album of the Year - Agricultural Tragic (Corb Lund)
Male Artist of the Year - Dallas Smith
Female Artist of the Year - Tenille Townes
Group or Duo of the Year - The Reklaws
Interactive Artist/Group of the Year - Lindsay Ell
Rising Star - Robyn Ottolini
Single of the Year - "Like a Man" (Dallas Smith)
Songwriter of the Year - "Champagne Night" (Patricia Conroy, Ester Dean, Andrew DeRoberts, Dave Haywood, Charles Kelley, Shane McAnally, Madeline Merlo, Tina Parol, Hillary Scott, Ryan Tedder, Dave Thomson)
Video of the Year - "Make a Life, Not a Living" (Brett Kissel)
Top Selling Canadian Album of the Year - Timeless (Dallas Smith)
Top Selling Canadian Single of the Year - Can't Help Myself" (Dean Brody & The Reklaws)
Producer of the Year - Danick Dupelle
Drummer of the Year - Matthew Atkins & Ben Bradley
Fiddle Player of the Year - Tyler Vollrath
Specialty Instrument Player of the Year - Mitch Jay

CMT Music Awards 
(presented on June 9, 2021)
Video of the Year - "Hallelujah" (Carrie Underwood featuring John Legend)
Male Video of the Year - "Worship You" (Kane Brown)
Female Video of the Year - "The Good Ones" (Gabby Barrett)
Duo/Group Video of the Year - "Wine, Beer, Whiskey" (Little Big Town)
Breakthrough Video of the Year - "Nobody" (Dylan Scott)
Collaborative Video of the Year - "Famous Friends" (Chris Young, featuring Kane Brown)
CMT Performance of the Year - "The Other Girl" (Kelsea Ballerini featuring Halsey)
Family Feature - "The Best Day" (Taylor Swift)
CMT Equal Play Award - Linda Martell

CMT Artists of the Year
 (presented October 13, 2021 in Nashville)
Kelsea Ballerini
Luke Combs
Gabby Barrett
Mickey Guyton
Chris Stapleton

Artist of a Lifetime: Randy Travis

Country Music Association Awards 
(presented on November 10, 2021)

 Entertainer of the Year –  Luke Combs
 Male Vocalist of the Year – Chris Stapleton
 Female Vocalist of the Year – Carly Pearce
 Vocal Group of the Year – Old Dominion
 New Artist of the Year – Jimmie Allen
 Vocal Duo of the Year – Brothers Osborne
 Musician of the Year – Jenee Fleenor (fiddle)
 Single of the Year – "Starting Over" (Chris Stapleton)
 Song of the Year – "Starting Over" (Mike Henderson and Chris Stapleton)
 Album of the Year – Starting Over (Chris Stapleton)
 Musical Event of the Year – "Half of My Hometown" (Kelsea Ballerini featuring Kenny Chesney)
 Video of the Year – "Half of My Hometown" (Kelsea Ballerini featuring Kenny Chesney)

Grammy Awards 
(presented on April 3, 2022)
 Best Country Solo Performance – "You Should Probably Leave" (Chris Stapleton)
 Best Country Duo/Group Performance – "Younger Me" (Brothers Osborne
 Best Country Song – "Cold" (Dave Cobb, J.T. Cure, Derek Mixon, Chris Stapleton)
 Best Country Album – Starting Over (Chris Stapleton)
 Best Bluegrass Album – My Bluegrass Heart (Béla Fleck)
 Best Americana Album – Native Sons (Los Lobos)
 Best American Roots Performance – "Cry" (Jon Batiste)
 Best American Roots Song – "Cry" (Jon Batiste, Steve McEwan)
 Best Roots Gospel Album – My Savior (Carrie Underwood)

International Bluegrass Music Awards 
(presented on September 30, 2021)

Entertainer of the Year – Billy Strings
Male Vocalist of the Year – Del McCoury and Danny Paisley 
Female Vocalist of the Year – Dale Ann Bradley
Vocal Group of the Year – Sister Sadie
Instrumental Group of the Year – Appalachian Road Show
New Artist of the Year – Appalachian Road Show
Album of the Year – Industrial Strength Bluegrass: Southern Ohio's Musical Legacy (Joe Mullins)
Song of the Year – "Richest Man" (Jim Beavers, Connie Harrington,Jimmy Yeary)
Gospel Recording of the Year – "After While" (Dale Ann Bradley) and "In the Resurrection Morning" (Sacred Reunion featuring Doyle Lawson, Vince Gill, Barry Abernathy, Tim Stafford, Mark Wheeler, Jim VanCleve, Phil Leadbeter and Jason Moore)
Instrumental Recording of the Year – "Ground Speed" (Kristin Scott Benson, Skip Cherryholmes, Jeremy Garrett, Kevin Kehrberg and Darren Nicholson)
Collaborative Recording of the Year – "White Line Fever" (Bobby Osborne with Tim O'Brien, Trey Hensley, Sierra Hull, Stuart Duncan, Todd Phillips and Alison Brown)
Guitar Player of the Year – Billy Strings
Banjo Player of the Year – Scott Vestal
Fiddle Player of the Year – Bronwyn Keith-Hynes
Mandolin Player of the Year – Sierra Hull
Bass Player of the Year – Missy Raines
Resophonic Guitar Player of the Year – Justin Moses

Juno Awards 
(presented on May 15, 2022)
Country Album of the Year - What Is Life? (Brett Kissel)

References 

Country
Country music by year
Culture-related timelines by year